Itil may mean:
Atil or Itil, the ancient capital of Khazaria
Itil (river), also Idel, Atil, Atal, the ancient and modern Turkic name of the river Volga.

ITIL can stand for:
ITIL, a set of practices for IT service management and associated certifications.